Amsactarctia venusta is a moth of the family Erebidae. It was described by Hervé de Toulgoët in 1980. It is found in Ethiopia and Somalia.

References

Moths described in 1980
Spilosomina
Insects of Ethiopia
Fauna of Somalia
Moths of Africa